Encounters South African International Documentary Festival (Encounters) is the premier documentary festival in Africa and one of the oldest film festivals on the continent. It remains one of only a few on the continent that is solely dedicated to the genre. Since its inception, the festival has advanced the currency of documentaries in the country and region, supporting new productions and giving an African platform to international documentaries.

Background

The Encounters South African International Documentary Festival first took place in 1999. Since then, its main objective has been to develop the documentary industry in South Africa, both in terms of increasing production and creating an audience for the genre. The festival actively seeks to support and promote local and African films, filmmakers and festivals to an international market.

Encounters takes place annually in both Cape Town and Johannesburg during the month of June. In 2012, the festival drew 11,000 audience members, and in its 14-year life-span, there have been 139,556 attendees. Since its inception, the festival has presented 1,461 films, of which 487 are South African titles.

Above and beyond its status as a documentary festival, Encounters also puts great emphasis on the coordination of educational projects.

From 1999 to 2007, the Film Laboratory gave selected first-time directors the opportunity to work with a team of experienced filmmakers on proposed projects of their own.  Every year, the week-long initiative ended with a final pitching session from which e.tv commissioned two films to be produced. Over the years, the Laboratory trained 58 emerging and experienced filmmakers, producing 46 films including shorts on the mobi platform.

The Producers Workshop, a further educational platform has trained 24 emerging SMME Producers whilst the High Schools Programme has screened films with facilitated discussions in 12 high schools in greater Cape Town.

Annual events 
Every year the festival hosts and incorporates a number of events above and beyond the film screenings themselves.

After world premieres (usually of South African films) and screenings of international guests' films, question and answer sessions open to the public often take place. Master classes are conducted by local and international guests — producers, writers, commissioning editors, sales agents and distributors, addressing a wide range of topics; anything from industry trends to effective marketing and crowd funding. Similarly, but more specifically targeted towards government arts & culture departments and institutes, are the Industry Presentations on offer. The festival also aims to help and advise small production companies on best practice through the "Producers Workshop".

To broaden the base of the documentary audience, Encounters offers cinema tickets and free entrance to Industry programmes to students and young professionals from disadvantaged backgrounds.

Audience awards 
Encounters implements' an annual Audience Award for Best South African and Best International films. Decided by popular vote, all films are eligible for these honours. By 2013, funding permitted, the Festival will implement a Jury Award with prize money in both categories. Not all films will be included ‘in competition’.

Audience Winners - South African

Audience Winners - International

Continental and international profile 
Over the years Encounters has collaborated and partnered with international festivals, markets, commissioning editors and sales agents. The festival hosts programmers from international festivals and has forged relationships with foreign correspondents who report on the Festival for their papers (for example, The Guardian).
Most major documentary festivals, in selecting African content, also programme from Encounters.

Partnerships and collaborations include:

•	Visions du Reel, Switzerland

•	Leipzig Documentary Festival, Germany

•	One World International Film Festival, Czech Republic

•	Brussels African Film Festival

•	Birds Eye View Festival, UK

•	New York Africa Film Festival

•	Movies that Matter Festival, Netherlands

•	Thessaloniki Documentary Festival, Greece

•	CinemaAfrika, Sweden

•	SilverDocs, USA

•	Sichuan TV Festival, China
•	MIPDOC-Trailblazer Award, Cannes
•	Berlinale DW-AKADEMIE
•	Al Jazeera English
•	FilmsTransit, Canada
•	Arte distribution, France
•	Cat & Docs, France
•	First Hand Films, Switzerland
•	Film Sales Company, USA

Filmmakers 

1999: Alexander J. Seiler, Richard Dindo, Thomas Imbach, Harriet Gavshon, Liz Fish, Cliff Bestall, Nicolaas Hofmeyer, Liza Key, Craig Matthew & Joëlle Chesselet.

2000: Niek Koppen, Hillie Molenaar, Patricia Plattner, Paul Watson, Lauren Groenewald, Lindy Wilson.

2001:  Werner Schweizer, Jan Heijs, Darcus Howe, Cliff Bestall, Craig & Damon Foster, Margo Fleiser, Claude Wittwenn, Ebrahim Hajee, Pule Diphare, Cathy Winter, Eddie Edwards, Nokuthula Mazibuko, Rob de Mezieres, Teboho Mahlatsi, Ingrid Gavshon, Rehad Desai, Luiz DeBarros, Craig Matthew & Joëlle Chesselet, Jack Lewis, Sharon Cort, John W Fredericks & Davide Tosco. 

2002: Christian Frei, Hetty Naaijekns-Retel Helmrich,  Vikram Jayanti, Cliff Bestall & Pearlie Joubert, Rehad Desai, Francois Verster, Tracey Collis, Penny Gaines, Andy Spitz, Eddie Edwards, Mpumi Njinge, Portia Rankoane, Beverley Palesa Ditsie & Nicky Newman, Ernie Vosloo, Jahmil XT Qubeka, Miki Redlinghuys, Gairoonisa Paleker, Renee Rosen, Xoliswa Sithole, Catherine Muller, Ouida Smit & Madoda Ncayiyana, Bearthur Baker, Dumisani Phakathi..

2003: Archie Baron, Paul de Bont, Sam Pollard, Viacheslav Telnov, Peter Wintonick, Craig Foster & Damon Foster, Carina Rubin, Pule Diphare, François Verster, Toni Strasburg, Aryan Kaganof, Ntombi Mzamane, John Fredericks, Vaughan Giose, Brenda Davis, Eugene Paramoer, Clifford Bestall, Emily McKay, Tamsyn Reynolds, Tamara Rothbart, Gerald Kraak, Mark Kaplan, Johnathan de Vries, Kali van der Merwe.

2004: Akiedah Mohamed, Andrea Spitz, Beverley Mitchell, Brian Tilley, Charles Najman, Cliff Bestall, Gillian Schutte, Jack Lewis, Jane Kennedy, Jihan El-Tahri, Karin Slater, Kethiwe Ngcobo, Khalo Matabane, Lauren Groenewald, Laurence Dworkin, Marijke Jongbloed, Martina della Togna, Minky Schlesinger, Omelga Mthiyane, Onyekachi Wambu, Peter Liechti, Riaan Hendricks, Rudzani Dzuguda, Shedreck Mapasa, Shelley Barry, Sipho Singiswa, Sunny Bergman, Teboho Edkins, Vaughan Giose, Zulfah Otto-Sallies

2005: Beverley Palesa Ditsie, Toni Strasburg, Ngaire Blankenberg, Zachie Achmat, Ditsi Carolino, Odette Geldenhuys, Rudzani Dzuguda, Isa-Lee Jacobsen, François Kohler, Bonganjalo Marala, Kim Longinotto, Omelga Hlengiwe Mthiyane, Beverley Mitchell, Leonard Retel Helmrich, Madoda Ncayiyana, Yeppe Rønde, Jemima Spring.

2006: Rehad Desai, Fumane Diseko, John W. Fredericks, Claude Haffner, Wendy Hardie, Susan Levine, Asivhanzhi Mathaba, Vincent Moloi, Omelga Mthiyane, Michael Raimondo, Portia Rankoane, Gillian Schutte-Singiswa, Sipho Singiswa, Karin Slater, Francois Verster, Nokuthula Dhladhla, Zanele Muholi, Salim Amin, Anna Bucchetti, Erik Gandini Gitmo, Jean-Pierre Krief, William Nessen, Tarek Saleh Gitmo, Sky Sitney, Bernard Surugue, Jean-Marie Teno.

2007: Cliff Bestall, Belinda Blignaut & Bridget Pickering Imbokodo, Ditsi Carolino, Nikki Comninos, Tamsen de Beer, Jihan El-Tahri, Angèle Diabang Brener, Sharon Farr, Liz Fish, Simon Klose, Karabo Lediga & Tamsin Andersson, Jack Lewis, Vincent Moloi, Premilla Murcott, Tebogo Ngoma, Eva Mulvad, Lindiwe Nkutha, Miki Redelinghuys, Leonard Retel Helmrich, Lomin Saayman & Lloyd Ross, Julian Shaw, Dylan Valley, Thomas Wallner, Carla Garapedian, Yunus Vally.

2008: Liza Aziz, Tony Bensusan, Sunny Bergman, Lucilla Blankenberg, Lederle Bosch, Don Edkins, Liz Fish, André Cronje & Carlos Francisco, Rehad Desai & Anita Khanna, Bertram Fredericks, Jeanette Jagger, Mali Kambandu, Tamarin Kaplan, Liza Key, Sifiso Khanyile, Kekeletso Khena, Joanne Levitan, Jane Lipman, Thapelo Maleka, Cyrille Maso, Dorothy Meck-Chimbuya, Nami Mhlongo, Steve Kwena Mokwena, Themba Monare, Villant Virginia Ndasowa, Stanley Nelson, Rob Nicholls,  Makela Pululu, Robyn Rorke, Karin Slater, Shaun Tomson, Catherine Winter.

2009: Emma Bestall, Angèle Diabang Brener, Nadine Angel Cloete, Liz Fish, Katrin Hansing, Freddy Ilanga, Riaan Hendricks, Jabulani Tsambo, Mark J. Kaplan, William Karel, Liza Key, Brian Little, Ntokozo Mahlalela, Zola Maseko, Dawn Matthews, Thabo Bruno Mokoena, Nhlanhla Mthethwa, Velcrow Ripper, Yoav Shamir, Lisa Swart, Francois Verster, Lindy Wilson.

2010: Cliff Bestall, Dylan Valley, Rina Jooste, Rehad Desai, Helena Kingwill, Tamandani Kapisa, Palesa Shongwe, Masechaba Mogane, Nami Mhlongo, Khanysile Maimela, Michael Raimondo, David Forbes, Lucilla Blankenberg, Steve Kwena Mokwena, Lesedi Mogoatlhe, Makela Yulele Pululu, Odette Geldenhuys, Stefanie Brockhaus & Andy Wolff, Mike Bardsley & Ayla Hilli, Denis Delstrac, Yoruba Richens, Daniel Yon, Omelga Mthiyane, Riaan Henricks, Jo Menell, Adrian Loveland.

2011: Göran Olsson, Jacques de Villiers, Julian Shaw, David Sieveking, Simon Wood, Tanswell Jansen, Ségolène Hanotaux, Lauren Beukes, Brian Tilley & Laurence Dworkin, Khalid Shamis, Karin Slater, Tim Wege, Omelga Mthiyane, Ángela Ramirez, Sara Gouveia, Calum McNaughton, Eric Miyeni, Navan Chetty, Eddie Edwards, Matthew Kalil, Tiny Laubscher, Chris Schutte, Kyle O’Donoghue, Wellbodi Biznes, Miki Redelinghuys, Kagiso Sesoko, Simon Bright, Shelley Barry.

2012: Bryan Little, James Walsh & Katherine Millar, Kurt & Crystal Orderson, Cliff Bestall, William Nessen, Riaan Hendricks, Mitzi Goldman & Andrea Durbach, Dylan Mohan Gray, Tsholofelo Monare, Thomas Barry, Jon Blair, Mandisa Madikane, Erez & Miri Laufer, Isy India Geronimo, Felix Seuffert, Simon Taylor, Wiseman Mabusela, Michael Cross, Richard Slater-Jones, Izette Mostert, Tamsyn Reynolds, Dowelani Nenzhelele, Sarah Ping Nie.

See also 
Visions du Reel
Al Jazeera
SilverDocs
Thessaloniki Documentary Festival

References

External links 

 Encounters website

Documentary film festivals in South Africa
Festivals in Cape Town
Festivals in Johannesburg